James D'Arcy (born Simon Richard D'Arcy; 24 August 1975) is an English actor and film director. He is known for his portrayals of Howard Stark's butler, Edwin Jarvis, in the Marvel Cinematic Universe television series Agent Carter and the 2019 film Avengers: Endgame, and murder suspect Lee Ashworth in the second season of the ITV series Broadchurch. D'Arcy also co-starred as Colonel Winnant in Christopher Nolan's war movie Dunkirk (2017).

Early life

D'Arcy was born on 24 August 1975 in Amersham, Buckinghamshire, and was raised in Fulham, London, with his younger sister Charlotte by their mother Caroline, a nurse. His father died when he was young. He has family in Ireland, England and Scotland, with his English relatives based around the Midlands.

After completing his education at Christ's Hospital in 1991, at age 17, D'Arcy went to Australia for a year. He worked in the drama department of Christ Church Grammar School in Perth, which gave him an interest in acting. When he returned to London he applied for drama school. He did a three-year course at the London Academy of Music and Dramatic Art (LAMDA), completing a BA in Acting in 1995.

During his time at LAMDA, he appeared in training productions of Heracles, As You Like It, Wild Honey, The Freedom of the City and Sherlock Holmes.

Career

His first appearances on television were small roles on the television series Silent Witness (1996) and Dalziel and Pascoe (1996), followed by roles in television films such as Nicholas Hawthorne in Ruth Rendell's Bribery and Corruption, Lord Cheshire in The Canterville Ghost, and Jonathan Maybury in The Ice House (all 1997).

In 1997, he played Blifil in The History of Tom Jones, a Foundling. In 1999, he acted in the World War I drama The Trench as well as having a small role in the comedy Guest House Paradiso. From 2001 to the present, he played bigger roles and leading characters in the mini-series Rebel Heart (2001 as Ernie Coyne), The Life and Adventures of Nicholas Nickleby (2001, Nicholas Nickleby) and Revelation (2001, Jake Martel). In 2002, he portrayed a young Sherlock Holmes in the television film Sherlock: Case of Evil.

In 2003, he played the role of Barnaby Caspian in the film Dot the I, and the character Jim Caddon on the series P.O.W. He also gained wider recognition when he portrayed Lt. Tom Pullings in Peter Weir's Master and Commander: The Far Side of the World (2003).

He appeared in the horror films Exorcist: The Beginning (2004, Father Francis), An American Haunting (2005, Richard Powell) and Rise: Blood Hunter (2007, Bishop). He also appeared on television as Derek Kettering in Agatha Christie's Poirot,  The Mystery of the Blue Train (2005), as Jerry Burton in Agatha Christie's Marple: The Moving Finger, as Tiberius Gracchus in the Ancient Rome: The Rise and Fall of an Empire  episode "Revolution" (2007), as Toby Clifford in Fallen Angel (2007) and as Tom Bertram in ITV's production of Mansfield Park (2007).

He lent his voice to BBC radio dramas such as Thomas Hardy's Tess of the d'Urbervilles, Bram Stoker's Dracula and Winifred Holtby's The Crowded Street. He played the role of Duncan Atwood in Secret Diary of a Call Girl. In 2011, he played the role of King Edward VIII in W.E., the second film directed by Madonna. In 2012, he played Rufus Sixsmith (young and old) in addition to two other minor roles in the independent film Cloud Atlas, as well as Psycho star Anthony Perkins in Hitchcock.

In 2013, he played the role of Eric Zimit in After the Dark (other title: The Philosophers). In mid-2014, he played the role of Lee Ashworth in series 2 of  Broadchurch. He also appeared as the main villain in the 2014 action comedy Let's Be Cops, as a malevolent Los Angeles crime boss. He starred as a British Army Colonel Winnant in Christopher Nolan's Dunkirk (2017).
In 2018 he appeared in the Showtime series Homeland. Between January 2015 and March 2016, D'Arcy was a series regular in the television series Agent Carter, which shares continuity with the Marvel Cinematic Universe. In the series, he played Edwin Jarvis, the loyal butler of Howard Stark. He reprised his role of Edwin Jarvis in Avengers: Endgame, making D'Arcy the first to have portrayed the same character originally from an MCU TV series into an MCU film.

Filmography

Film

Television

Awards
Nominated for the Ian Charleson Award in 2002 (Outstanding Performance in a Classical Role) for Edward II.

References

External links

1975 births
Male actors from London
Alumni of the London Academy of Music and Dramatic Art
English male film actors
English male television actors
Living people
People educated at Christ's Hospital
Actors from Amersham
People from Fulham
Male actors from Buckinghamshire
20th-century English male actors
21st-century English male actors